Frid Ingulstad (born 4 September 1935) is a Norwegian novelist, primarily of historical novels, many of them series. She has often been the best-selling author in Norway, and has published more than 200 books.

Life and career
Ingulstad was born in Oslo. She worked for Fred. Olsen Airtransport as a stenographer and then as a flight attendant, then on the Norwegian America Line ship Idefjord as a radio telegrapher, before becoming a full-time writer in 1990. Her first book, Hva livet gir deg, Camilla, was published in 1965; a travel book had been previously rejected.

She is best known for her novel series, in particular Sønnavind, a series of historical novels set among factory workers along the Akerselva; beginning in the early 20th century with the first book, published in 2005, in 2020 the series reached 100 books with Velkommen hjem, set in 1959. Other series by her are Kongsdøtrene (the first book of which, Ingegjerd, was her 140th book, in 2007), Ildkorset, and Ingebjørg Olavsdatter. She has also written children's books, both fiction and non-fiction, and a biography of Betzy Kjelsberg, Betzy. Fortellingen om en norsk foregangskvinne (2015).

Ingulstad has frequently been the best-selling author in Norway, for example in 2006, with 420,000 books.  she had total sales of approximately 4 million books. She published her 200th book (in the Sønnavind series) in 2013;  the total was 243.

She was repeatedly rejected for membership in the Norwegian Authors' Union, occasioning discussion about the organisation's definition of "literary worth". At its foundation in 2018, she became a member of the initial board of directors of the rival organisation .

She published an autobiography, Min historie, in 2007.

Honours
Mannemakt og mørkemakter won first prize in a contest by the publisher Dreijer. Munken (1991) won a prize from Gyldendal and is possibly her best known book.

She received the Oslo City art award in 2010 and the King's Medal of Merit in 2018.

In 2017 the Riksmål Society awarded her its first personal prize.

Personal life
Ingulstad married Arnulf Ingulstad, an engineer, in 1975. They have a son together, and two daughters from her first marriage. They live in the house where she was born and raised, in the Kastellet section of Nordstrand, in Oslo.

References

External links
Personal website, archived on 22 April 2016 
Publisher's page 
List of books published as of 23 January 2007, Verdens Gang.

1935 births
Living people
20th-century Norwegian novelists
21st-century Norwegian novelists
Norwegian women novelists
21st-century Norwegian women writers
20th-century Norwegian women writers
Writers from Oslo
Recipients of the King's Medal of Merit in silver